The Shepherds' Field Chapel or the Sanctuary of the Gloria in excelsis Deo, dedicated to Our Lady of Fatima and St. Theresa of Lisieux, is a Roman Catholic religious building in the area of Beit Sahour, southeast of Bethlehem in the West Bank in Palestine. The chapel marks the place where, according to Catholic tradition, angels first announced the birth of Christ.

Biblical relevance

The site of the Annunciation to the shepherds favoured by tradition is not this, but the Orthodox one, on the other side of the valley (see Beit Sahour article).

History

Roman period
In 1951–52, prior to the construction of the present chapel, Franciscan archaeologist Virgilio Canio Corbo excavated the site and found caves with evidence of human habitation during the Herodian and later Roman period, as well as ancient oil presses. Corbo used his findings as arguments in favour of the hypothesis that a small community inhabited the site at the time of Jesus' birth. Murphy-O'Connor concludes that the site was occupied during the first century by nomadic shepherds.

Byzantine period
Over the Roman-period remnants, a Byzantine monastery was built at the end of the 4th century, which went through a second, rebuilding and expansion phase in the 6th. The monastery was destroyed by the Persians in 614 and was not reoccupied afterwards. The remains were destroyed in the 8th century by Muslims who chiseled off the Christian signs from several stones.

Modern church
The Shepherds' Field Chapel was built by the Franciscans in 1953. It is not far from the Greek Orthodox Der El Rawat Chapel, commemorating the same event.

Architecture
The chapel was designed by architect Antonio Barluzzi. Under the chapel is a large cave.

It has five apses that mimic the structure of a nomadic tent in gray. The words of the angel to the shepherds are inscribed gold. An image depicting the birth of Jesus can be seen in the place.

Gallery

See also
Roman Catholicism in the State of Palestine
Church of St. Catherine, Bethlehem

References

External links
 Youtube presentation by tour guide

Roman Catholic churches in Bethlehem
Roman Catholic churches completed in 1953
Roman Catholic chapels in the State of Palestine
20th-century Roman Catholic church buildings